Héctor Neris (born June 14, 1989) is a Dominican professional baseball pitcher for the Houston Astros of Major League Baseball (MLB). He has previously played in MLB for the Philadelphia Phillies. He was signed as a free agent by the Phillies in 2010, and made his major league debut with them in 2014.

Early life
Héctor Neris was born in Villa Altagracia, in the Dominican Republic.  He played volleyball, basketball, and chess at the Colegio José Francisco Peña Gómez, graduating in 2008.

Career

Philadelphia Phillies

2010–12
Neris was signed as a free agent by the Philadelphia Phillies on May 28, 2010. He pitched for the Dominican Summer League Phillies and was 1-1 with five saves and a 3.24 Earned run average with 34 strikeouts in 41.2 innings, holding batters to a .199 batting average.

In 2011 he split the season between the Class A- Williamsport Crosscutters and the Class A Lakewood BlueClaws. Neris was a combined 3-2 with a 2.75 earned run average and 72 strikeouts in 59 innings, averaging 11.0 strikeouts per 9 innings pitched.

In 2012 Neris pitched for the Class A+ Clearwater Threshers. He was 4-2 with six saves, a 3.55 earned run average, and 94 strikeouts in  innings, averaging 10.8 strikeouts per 9 innings pitched.

2013–15
In 2013 he pitched for the Class AA Reading Fightin Phils. Neris was 6-4 with a 4.55 earned run average and 93 strikeouts in 97 innings.

In 2014 in the minors Neris split his time between Reading and the Class AAA Lehigh Valley IronPigs. He was a combined 6-3 with two saves, a 3.61 earned run average and 70 strikeouts in  innings.

Neris was called up to the majors for the first time on August 3, 2014. He made his major league debut on August 5 versus the Houston Astros, pitching a scoreless top of the 15th inning; the Phillies scored in the bottom of the inning, earning Neris his first major league victory.  However, after the game, he was optioned back to Lehigh Valley to open a roster spot for the next night's starting pitcher, David Buchanan. In 2014 with the Phillies he pitched in only that one game.

He split time in 2015 between the AAA Lehigh Valley and the Phillies bullpen, appearing in 35 games. Neris finished 2-2 for the Phillies with a 3.79 earned run average with 41 strikeouts in  innings, averaging 9.2 strikeouts per 9 innings pitched. With Lehigh Valley, he was 1-3 with one save, a 3.62 earned run average and 35 strikeouts in  innings.

2016–2021

In 2016, Neris served as a setup man in the Phillies bullpen, with a record of 4–4, 2 saves, 28 holds (tied for 4th in the NL), and posting an earned run average of 2.58 in 79 games (3rd in the National League). In  innings, he struck out 102 batters (2nd-most ever by a Phillies reliever, behind Dick Selma in 1970, and 31.1% of the batters he faced), averaging 11.4 strikeouts per 9 innings pitched.

He pitched for the Dominican Republic national baseball team in the 2017 World Baseball Classic.

In 2017, Neris served as the Phillies closer. He was 4–5 with a 3.01 earned run average and had 26 saves (8th in the league) in 29 opportunities, and pitched in 74 games (5th in the NL). He struck out 86 batters in  innings, averaging 10.4 strikeouts per 9 innings pitched. He threw a splitter 51.3% of the time, tops in the major leagues.

Neris began the 2018 season as the team's closer, but was demoted from the role a month into the season, and on June 18 was optioned to AAA. He was recalled just three days later. On June 29 he was optioned to AAA for a second stint, after giving up five earned runs in a 17–7 loss to the Washington Nationals. Neris returned to the major leagues on August 14. He was named NL Reliever of the Month for August, after striking out 20 of the 32 batters he faced that month (62.5%). In 2018 with the Phillies, he was 1–2 with 11 saves, a 5.10 earned run average, and 76 strike outs in  innings, averaging 14.3 strikeouts per 9 innings pitched. The only NL pitcher with a higher strikeout rate than Neris in 2018 was Josh Hader. He threw a four-seam fastball that averaged 95 miles per hour. He also threw a splitter 49.1% of the time, tops in the major leagues. In 2018 with AAA Lehigh Valley, he was 2–0 with one save, a 1.15 earned run average, and 31 strikeouts in  innings, averaging 14.9 strikeouts per 9 innings pitched.

In 2019 with the Phillies, Neris was 3–6 with 28 saves (7th in the National League) and a 2.93 earned run average in 68 relief appearances, with 89 strike outs in  innings (averaging 11.8 strikeouts per 9 innings). In 2020 for Philadelphia, Neris pitched to a 2–2 record with 5 saves and a 4.57 earned run average to go along with 27 strikeouts across  innings pitched in 24 games. In 2021, Neris went 4–7 with 12 saves in 19 chances, recording a 3.63 earned run average and 98 strikeouts in  innings.

Houston Astros
On November 30, 2021, Neris signed a two-year contract worth $17 million with the Houston Astros.  On April 12, 2022, at Chase Field, he struck out two in a perfect eighth inning versus the Arizona Diamondbacks to earn his first win in an Astros uniform in a 2–1 score. On June 7, 2022, Neris was suspended 4 games for throwing at the head of the Seattle Mariners third basemen Eugenio Suárez.

He pitched the eighth inning of a combined no-hitter and 3–0 win over the New York Yankees on June 25, 2022.  The 14th no-hitter in Astros' history, Cristian Javier started the game and Ryan Pressly closed it for a save.  Neris struck out two on July 3 in a 4–2 victory over the Los Angeles Angels in which Astros pitchers struck out 20 batters to establish a franchise record in a nine inning contest.  Contributing were starter Framber Valdez (first six innings), Neris (7th), Rafael Montero (8th) and Pressly (9th).

Neris earned his second save of the season on August 12, 2022, by throwing a scoreless ninth in a 7–5 win over the Oakland Athletics.  On September 19, Neris closed out the final inning of a 4–0 defeat of the Tampa Bay Rays and clinch a fifth American League West division title for the Astros over the previous six seasons.   On October 4, 2022, Neris made his first career appearance versus the Phillies and induced two perfect outs in an on-going no-hitter that Houston pitching maintained until the ninth inning.  

For the 2022 regular season, Neris made 70 appearances, ranking fifth in the AL among pitchers, and had 25 holds, which tied for third and led the Astros.  He produced a 3.72 ERA, 6–4 W–L, three saves, 2.35 Fielding Independent Pitching (FIP), 79 strikeouts, 17 bases on balls, and three home runs allowed over  IP for ratios of 10.9 strikeouts per nine innings pitched (K/9), 4.65 strikeouts to walks (K/BB), and 0.4 home runs per nine innings (HR/9).

In his first career postseason appearance, Neris induced a two-out, bases-loaded groundout from Cal Raleigh in the sixth inning in Game 2 of the American League Division Series {ALDS} versus the Seattle Mariners, and was the winning pitcher.  He allowed a go-ahead home run in Game 4 of the American League Championship Series (ALCS) versus the Yankees, but the Astros rallied the following inning to win the game, making him the pitcher of note as the Astros won the pennant in four games.  The Astros again faced the Phillies in the World Series and defeated them in six games to give Neris his first World Series title, and he pitched a scoreless seventh inning in the Game 6 clincher.  He went 2–0 in the postseason, allowing two hits and one run over eight appearances and six innings (1.50 ERA).  He struck out nine, allowed no walks, and this performance netted a 9.9% championship win probability added (cWPA).

Pitching style 
As of 2022, the right-hander Neris relies on four pitches in his pitching repertoire, a four-seam fastball averaging 94 miles per hour, a sinker averaging near 95 miles per hour, a splitter averaging 84 miles per hour, and a slider averaging about 88 miles per hour. Neris exclusively relies on throwing his split-fingered fastball to get outs, utilizing it at higher percentage than his four-seam fastball and sinker at 40.6% in the 2021 season and throwing it a career high 65.3% in 2019 which lead to him collecting a career high 28 saves with 57 strikeouts on his splitter alone in 2019. Neris utilizes the splitter especially for swinging strikeouts, since splitters appear to have a typical fastball movement until it drops suddenly as it comes to the plate. This resulted in Neris collecting a 45% whiff percentage on his splitter in the 2021 season. Neris throws his slider the least out of his four pitches, never throwing it for more than 17 percent of all his pitches in every season he utilized it since 2015.

Neris pitches from the set position, starting his delivery after receiving the pitch call by tucking the baseball behind his glove near his hip similarly to former Phillies closer Jonathan Papelbon, adding deception. Neris is a very expressive player on the mound, as he often celebrates after getting important outs especially clutch strikeouts on hitters late in games and getting the final out to collect saves. Neris once after getting Justin Turner out on a flyout to collect a save against the Dodgers in 2019, he reportedly shouted expletives towards the Dodgers' dugout while celebrating which Dodgers' manager Dave Roberts stated "To look in our dugout and to taunt in any way, I think it’s unacceptable..."

See also 

 List of Houston Astros no-hitters
 List of Major League Baseball no-hitters
 List of Major League Baseball players from the Dominican Republic

References
Footnotes

Sources

External links

1989 births
Living people
Clearwater Threshers players
Dominican Republic expatriate baseball players in the United States
Dominican Summer League Phillies players
Houston Astros players
Lakewood BlueClaws players
Lehigh Valley IronPigs players
Major League Baseball pitchers
Major League Baseball players from the Dominican Republic
People from San Cristóbal Province
Philadelphia Phillies players
Toros del Este players
Reading Fightin Phils players
Williamsport Crosscutters players
World Baseball Classic players of the Dominican Republic
2017 World Baseball Classic players
2023 World Baseball Classic players